Riverside Plantation in Enterprise, Clarke County, Mississippi was built in 1850.  It was listed on the U.S. National Register of Historic Places in 1980. It is the sole two-story, Greek Revival plantation in Clarke County, Mississippi. It is said to have served as the headquarters for the Union forces during their occupation of Enterprise, Mississippi during the Civil War.

References

Houses on the National Register of Historic Places in Mississippi
Houses completed in 1850
Houses in Clarke County, Mississippi
National Register of Historic Places in Clarke County, Mississippi